Juha is a novel by Juhani Aho, published in 1911. It is considered one of Aho's most important works: after its publication, Aho consolidated his role as the "national writer" of Finland. The novel is at once characterized as one of his most classical and most modern works. Although taking the form of an epic, Juha does not lack drama in its plot.

Hannes Närhi played Juha in Tapiovaara's film, Mathias Taube in Stiller's film, Eino Kaipainen in Särkä's film and Sakari Kuosmanen in Kaurismäki's film. Based on Juha, Mikko Roiha directed a dance theater work of the same name, which premiered at Korjaamo in January 2010.

Plot 
Shemeikka, a travelling merchant from White Karelia, seduced Juha's wife Marja. Marja left Juha's household in Swedish Finland with Shemeikka to Russian Karelia, where she found his "harem" with many other women serving in near slavery.

Marja lost favour with Shemeikka, despite giving birth to his child. She succeeded in returning to Finland. Juha believed she was abducted. When they went to Russia to retrieve her child, Juha assaulted Shemeikka, who explained that Marja left of her own will.

Adaptations 
 Aarre Merikanto: opera Juha, written 1922, premiered 1958.
 Leevi Madetoja: opera Juha, written 1931–34, premiered 1935.
 Nyrki Tapiovaara: film Juha (1937)
 Toivo Särkkä: film 
 Aki Kaurismäki: silent film Juha (1999).
 Mikko Roiha: dance piece Juha, January 2010.

References

 Toiviainen, Sakari: Nyrki Tapiovaaran tie; Suomen elokuva-arkisto, Valtion painatuskeskus, Helsinki 1986, 
 Aho, Juhani: Juha, 1911, Suomalaisen kirjallisuuden seura 1994, 

1911 novels
Finnish novels adapted into films
Novels adapted into operas